Familial dysbetalipoproteinemia or type III hyperlipoproteinemia is a condition characterized by increased total cholesterol and triglyceride levels, and decreased HDL levels.

Signs and symptoms 

Signs of familial dysbetaproteinemia include xanthoma striatum palmare (orange or yellow discoloration of the palms) and tuberoeruptive xanthomas over the elbows and knees. The disease leads to premature atherosclerosis and therefore a possible early onset of coronary artery disease and peripheral vascular disease leading to a heart attack, i.e. myocardial infarction, chest pain on exercise, i.e. angina pectoris or stroke in young adults or middle aged patients.

Causes 

This condition is caused by a mutation in apolipoprotein E (ApoE), that serves as a ligand for the liver receptor for chylomicrons,  IDL and VLDL, also known as very-low-density-lipoprotein receptor. The normal ApoE turns into the defective ApoE2 form due to a genetic mutation. This defect prevents the normal metabolism of chylomicrons, IDL and VLDL, otherwise known as remnants, and therefore leads to accumulation of cholesterol within scavenger cells (macrophages) to enhance development and acceleration of atherosclerosis.

Diagnosis

Treatment
First line of management are fibrates.

See also 
 Primary hyperlipoproteinemia
 Apolipoprotein B deficiency
 List of cutaneous conditions

References

External links 

Skin conditions resulting from errors in metabolism
Lipid metabolism disorders